A shortage is a situation in which the demand for a product or service exceeds its supply in a market.

Shortage may also refer to:
Shortages related to the COVID-19 pandemic
Shortage economy
Shortages in Venezuela